Beladingalagi Baa is a 2008 Kannada-language film directed by M. S. Ramesh. The music of the film was composed by Gurukiran.

Cast 

 Chandrashekhara Kambara
 Vijay Raghavendra
 Ramaneethu Chaudari
 Rangayana Raghu
 Mandeep Roy
 Sanketh Kashi
 Vanishree

Release and reception 
The film released in February 2008 and received mainly negative reviews. Sify in their review wrote that the film lacked substance and a "required punch" was missing.

Soundtrack

References 

2008 films
2000s Kannada-language films